The Journal of Ethology is a peer-reviewed scientific journal covering all aspects of ethology. It is published by Springer Science+Business Media on behalf of the Japan Ethological Society and was established in 1983 as a bilingual journal in English and Japanese. Initially, the journal focused on research conducted in Japan, but it has since expanded to include submissions from around the world and nowadays publishes in English only. The editor-in-chief is Takeshi Takegaki (Nagasaki University).

The journal publishes research articles, reviews, and commentaries related to the behavior of animals in their natural environment, as well as research conducted in laboratory settings.

Abstracting and indexing
The journal is abstracted and indexed in:

According to the Journal Citation Reports, the journal has a 2021 impact factor of 1.202.

References

External links

English-language journals
Springer Science+Business Media academic journals
Publications established in 1983
Ethology journals
Triannual journals